The Ven. George Tucker (1 November 1835 – 6 April 1908)  was Archdeacon of Bermuda from 1896 until 1909.

He was educated at Yale College and ordained in 1861.  After a curacy at gap Notre Dame Bay he was Rector of St Mark, Smith's Parish, Bermuda until his appointment as Archdeacon. A set of bells at St Mark commemorate his long service.

References

Yale College alumni
19th-century Anglican priests
20th-century Anglican priests
Archdeacons of Bermuda
1835 births
1908 deaths
People from Smith's Parish